The South African Railways Class H1 4-8-2T of 1903 was a steam locomotive from the pre-Union era in Transvaal.

In 1902, towards the end of the Second Boer War, the Imperial Military Railways placed 35  tank locomotives in service, built to the specifications of the Reid Tenwheeler of the Natal Government Railways. At the end of the war, these locomotives came onto the roster of the Central South African Railways and were designated its Class E. Six of these locomotives were then converted to  tank locomotives. In 1912, after the establishment of the South African Railways, the five survivors of these six were designated Class H1.

Origin
The requirement for a tank locomotive which could haul at least one-and-a-half times as much as a Dübs A  locomotive on the Natal Government Railways (NGR) mainline, resulted in the design of a  tank locomotive by G.W. Reid, the Locomotive Superintendent of the NGR at the end of the 19th century. On the NGR, the locomotive type became known as the Reid Tenwheeler, later designated the NGR Class C .

Manufacturers

In 1902, during the Second Boer War, the Imperial Military Railways (IMR) of the invading British forces experienced a shortage of locomotives as a result of damage caused during hostilities and the transportation demands which were placed on the Railways by the British Military.

Lieutenant-Colonel E.P.C. Girouard KCMG DSO of the Royal Engineers, the Commissioner of Railways for the Transvaal and Orange River Colony, therefore placed urgent orders for 35 locomotives of the NGR's Reid Tenwheeler type. To ensure rapid delivery, the order was split between Dübs and Company, who built engine numbers 220 to 234, and Neilson, Reid and Company, who built numbers 235 to 254.

Service

Imperial Military Railways
Compared to the NGR versions, the IMR locomotives were more ornate. In true military tradition, the steam domes, chimney caps and boiler bands were of polished brass. A weatherboard was affixed to the coal bunker to offer better protection to the crew when travelling bunker forward.

The practice of polished brasswork was followed on all new IMR locomotives and was continued even after the war, when the IMR became the Central South African Railways (CSAR).

Central South African Railways
At the end of the war, these Reid Tenwheeler locomotives were designated Class E on the CSAR roster.

Six of the Class E locomotives, CSAR numbers 222, 233-235, 245 and 252, were converted to  Mountain type locomotives c. 1903 by removing the fifth pair of coupled wheels and blanking off the resulting opening in the frame. The same modification was also done by the NGR on some of its own Reid Tenwheelers to make them more suitable for yard work.

South African Railways
When the Union of South Africa was established on 31 May 1910, the three Colonial government railways (Cape Government Railways, NGR and CSAR) were united under a single administration to control and administer the railways, ports and harbours of the Union. Although the South African Railways and Harbours came into existence in 1910, the actual classification and renumbering of all the rolling stock of the three constituent railways were only implemented with effect from 1 January 1912.

In SAR service, the five survivors of these CSAR  tank locomotives were designated Class H1. The locomotives were used extensively for shunting work in several parts of the country. The Class H1 had a long service life and the last of the Class was only withdrawn from service in 1966.

Works numbers
The builders, works numbers, rebuilding and renumbering of all 35 original  locomotives are listed in the table.

References

1140
1140
4-8-2 locomotives
2D1 locomotives
4-8-2T locomotives
Dübs locomotives
Neilson Reid locomotives
Cape gauge railway locomotives
Railway locomotives introduced in 1903
1903 in South Africa
Scrapped locomotives